ROKS Seoul (FFG-821) is the third ship of the Daegu-class frigate in the Republic of Korea Navy. She is named after the capital, Seoul.

Development 

Modifications to the Incheon-class include a TB-250K towed array sonar system and a 16-cell Korean Vertical Launching System (K-VLS) that is able to deploy the K-SAAM, Hong Sang Eo anti-submarine missile, and Haeryong tactical land attack cruise missiles.

The hull design is generally based on the one of the Incheon-class. However, as a part of weapon system modifications, the superstructure has been significantly changed. The hangar and a hellicopter deck on stern has been enlarged to support the operation of a 10-ton helicopter.

Construction and career 
ROKS Seoul was launched on 11 November 2019 by Hyundai Heavy Industries and expected to be commissioned in 2021.

References 

2019 ships
Daegu-class frigates
Ships built by Hyundai Heavy Industries Group